Clark Peak may refer to:

 Clark Peak (Alaska) in Alaska, USA
 Clark Peak (Antarctica)
 Clark Peak (Arizona) in Arizona, USA
 Clark Peak (British Columbia) in British Columbia, Canada
 Clark Peak (California) in California, USA
 Clark Peak (Elk Mountains) in the Elk Mountains, Colorado, USA
 Clark Peak (Medicine Bow Mountains) highest summit of the Medicine Bow Mountains, Colorado, USA
 Clark Peak (New Mexico) in New Mexico, USA
 Clark Peak (Washington) in Washington, USA
 Clark Peak near Nelson, New Zealand